Barbara Ann Mellers is I. George Heyman University Professor in the psychology department at the University of Pennsylvania. Her research focuses on decision processes.

Education 
Mellers earned her undergraduate degree in psychology from the University of California, Berkeley in 1974. She went on to do graduate work in psychology at the University of Illinois at Urbana–Champaign, earning an M.A. in 1978 and a Ph.D. in 1981.

Career 
Mellers' research focuses on decision processes. She conducts both laboratory and field experimental work that examine human decision-making and its implications for politics and public policy.

Prior to joining the University of Pennsylvania, Mellers was professor of marketing and organizational behavior at the University of California, Berkeley. At Penn, she is I. George Heyman University Professor in the psychology department.

Mellers is a co-founder of the Good Judgment Project, with colleagues Philip Tetlock and Don Moore. The project began in a competition funded by the United States' government's Intelligence Advanced Research Projects Activity; Mellers, Tetlock and Moore won with their crowdsourced approach to geopolitical and economic forecasting, which outperformed the government's own intelligence analysts' forecasts.

In 2017, Harvard University’s Kennedy School of Government awarded Mellers its Thomas C. Schelling Award in recognition of "remarkable intellectual work has had a transformative impact on public policy."

Personal life
Mellers is married to Philip Tetlock, who is also a University of Pennsylvania professor.

References

Living people
University of Pennsylvania people
University of Illinois Urbana-Champaign alumni
University of California, Berkeley alumni
Year of birth missing (living people)
American women psychologists
21st-century American psychologists
21st-century American women